Paul B. Israel (born 1953) is an American historian who is a specialist in the history of American invention and innovation. He is the director and general editor of the Thomas A. Edison Papers at Rutgers University.

Selected publications

References

External links

Rutgers University faculty
21st-century American historians
21st-century American male writers
Living people
1953 births
American male non-fiction writers